The 2015–16 Danish Under-19 League season is the 13th season of the Danish Under-19 League, which decides the Danish Youth Football Champions. Midtjylland are the defending champions.

The season started on August 15, 2015, and is supposed to end on July 4, 2016.

Teams
Teams consisted of ten teams from the 2015-16 Danish Superliga, with Viborg FF and Hobro IK missing. They are replaced with Vejle BK and Silkeborg IF.

Stadia and locations

Personnel and sponsoring
Note: Flags indicate national team as has been defined under FIFA eligibility rules. Players and Managers may hold more than one non-FIFA nationality.

League table

References

External links
  

1
Denmark